WLZX-FM (99.3 MHz) is a radio station in Northampton, Massachusetts. The station has an active rock format, and is owned by Saga Communications. The station is also simulcast on WLZX (1600 AM) and translator station W253CD (98.5 FM), both in East Longmeadow, as well as the HD2 channel of WAQY (102.1 FM) in Springfield.

Programming
WLZX-FM and WLZX air an active rock format. However, WLZX (AM), along with its FM translator, breaks away to carry Boston Bruins and Boston Celtics games. Both stations are affiliates of the Boston-based syndicated The Toucher and Rich Show.

History
WLZX-FM began when the station was purchased from Clear Channel, which operated 99.3 as WHMP-FM, the "Rock Alternative". Lazer 99.3 went live on September 11, 2000.

On February 3, 2017, WLZX-FM rebranded as "Lazer 99.3 & 105.1" and began simulcasting on WLZX (1600 AM, formerly WHNP) and FM translator W286DB (105.1 FM) in East Longmeadow, Massachusetts. As WHNP, the 1600 AM facility had simulcast the talk format of sister station WHMP. The station subsequently rebranded as "Lazer 99.3 & 98.5", in reflection of the translator's move to 98.5 FM as W253CD.

The WLZX stations switched to an alternative rock format in the summer of 2017, but returned to the active rock format at 6:00a.m. on February 4, 2020.

Translators
In addition to W253CD (98.5), which is fed by WLZX (AM), WLZX-FM has two translators: W232BW (94.3) in Amherst at 250 watts, which simulcasts its HD2 channel, a classic hits station branded as "Rewind 94.3"; and W245BK (96.9), also a 250-watt facility in Amherst, which simulcasts WLZX-FM's HD3 channel, an oldies station branded as "Pure Oldies 96.9".

References

External links

LZX-FM
Radio stations established in 1956
Northampton, Massachusetts
Mass media in Hampshire County, Massachusetts
1956 establishments in Massachusetts
Active rock radio stations in the United States